Mankins may refer to
Mankins, Texas, an unincorporated community in the United States
Jim Mankins (born 1944), American football player
Jimmy Mankins (1926–2013), American businessman and politician
Logan Mankins (born 1982), American football guard
John C. Mankins